Rex Wimpy (December 18, 1899 – December 29, 1972) was an American special effects artist and cinematographer. He was nominated for an Oscar for Best Special Effects for the film Air Force.

Selected filmography
 Stairs of Sand (1929)
 Pointed Heels (1929)
 Talent Scout (1937)
 Air Force (1943)
 Challenge of the Range (1949)
Laramie (1949)
Laramie Mountains (1952)

References

External links

1899 births
1972 deaths
American cinematographers
Special effects people
People from Grant County, Indiana